Rothrist railway station is a railway station in the municipality of Rothrist, in the Swiss canton of Aargau. It is an intermediate stop on the standard gauge Olten–Bern line of Swiss Federal Railways. The high-speed Mattstetten–Rothrist new line diverges west of the station but no trains calling at Rothrist use it.

Services
The following services stop at Rothrist:

References

External links 
 
 

Railway stations in the canton of Aargau
Swiss Federal Railways stations